From 1974 to 1976, the court-ordered busing of students to achieve school desegregation led to sporadic outbreaks of violence in Boston's schools and in the city's largely segregated neighborhoods. Although Boston was by no means the only American city to undertake a plan of school desegregation, the forced busing of students from some of the city's most impoverished and racially segregated neighborhoods led to an unprecedented level of violence and turmoil in the city's streets and classrooms and made national headlines.

History

Civil Rights Act of 1964 
Black children's achievement levels were consistently lower than those of white children. Their dropout rates were higher, their schools were dilapidated, their textbooks were out-of-date, and their often demoralized teachers were more concerned with maintaining order than with teaching. In cities as large as Chicago, New York, Detroit, and Denver, and as small as Plainfield, New Jersey, and Stamford, Connecticut, black mothers mobilized to improve the quality of their children's education. They fought for integration via busing, mostly because they believed it was the best way to address the problem quickly. White children went to well-funded, well-equipped schools that were often underpopulated. Black mothers, such as those who organized Chicago's Truth Squad or Englewood, New Jersey's Englewood Movement, sought to place these “neighborhood schools” within the reach of black children. NAACP lawyers supported them, arguing that there was no difference between school segregation that occurred as a result of a legal mandate (de jure segregation) and that which occurred as a result of state-sanctioned real estate discrimination (de facto segregation). Both resulted in black deprivation. 32 Black education advocates met with stiff resistance from whites, also mostly mothers, who greeted black children with racial epithets. In a nationally televised address on June 6, 1963, President John F. Kennedy urged the nation to take action toward guaranteeing equal treatment of every American regardless of race. Soon after, Kennedy proposed that Congress consider civil rights legislation that would address voting rights, public accommodations, school desegregation, nondiscrimination in federally assisted programs, and more. Despite Kennedy's assassination in November 1963, his proposal culminated in the Civil Rights Act of 1964, signed into law by President Lyndon Johnson just a few hours after House approval on July 2, 1964. The act outlawed segregation in businesses such as theaters, restaurants, and hotels. It banned discriminatory practices in employment and ended segregation in public places such as swimming pools, libraries, and public schools. In Plainfield, after a 1964 state order to desegregate schools, black students found the words nigger steps and nigger entrance painted on parts of Plainfield High School.

Racial Imbalance Act 
In 1965 legislature passed the Racial Imbalance Act. This law defined a racially imbalanced school as one with over 50 percent non-white students, and stated that any imbalanced school system could lose state funds.

Resistance 
White resistance forced African Americans to reconsider busing. Not only did Republicans, who had initiated the program, withdraw support, but by the 1970s whites who could do so had either moved to suburban areas that were beyond the reach of desegregation orders or sent their children to private schools.

R.O.A.R 
Restore Our Alienated Rights was an anti-desegregation busing organization formed in Boston, Massachusetts by Boston School Committee chairwoman Louise Day Hicks in 1974. Using tactics modeled on the civil rights movement, ROAR activists led marches in Charlestown and South Boston, public prayers, sit-ins of school buildings and government offices, protests at the homes of prominent Bostonians, mocked funerals, and even a small march on Washington DC. By 1976, with the failure to block implementation of the busing plan, the organization declined.

Violence

South Boston 

Hostile crowds gathered outside South Boston high school almost daily. In response to the violence, Judge Arthur Garrity, architect of the original Boston school desegregation plan, issued a judicial order in September 1975 that prohibited groups of three or more persons from gathering within 100 yards of the school.

Hyde Park 

At Hyde Park High, on January 9, 1975, the second day back to school after the winter break, a fist fight in the first floor corridor erupted into a series of confrontations that spilled out into the streets of Hyde Park, causing police to rush to the scene. Police arrested 15 students, 13 of whom were black, and classes were suspended after the third period. On January 21, 1976, violence broke out at Hyde Park High. Thirteen hundred black and white students fought each other throughout the school.

Senator Ted Kennedy 

Senator Ted Kennedy was giving a speech. Kennedy's speech was interrupted by a rowdy antibusing delegation that peppered the senator with insults, jeers, and name calling. Kennedy was chased to his car which had already been vandalized. Kennedy was whisked away by police to a train station whereto crowd hurled stones at the departing train.

Progressive Labor Party 

On May 3, there was a skirmish involving the South Boston youth and members of the PLP. The PLP were attempting to march from Dorchester to South Boston to the home of Louise Day Hicks, a prominent leader of the antibusing cause. About 100 South Boston residents returned to the parade route with baseball bats, hockey sticks, and rocks in an attempt to disrupt the march. The PLP riot sparked another melee at Hyde Park High School that lasted for two days on May 7 and 8. On May 9, an angry crowd at South Boston High threatened to throw projectiles at black students attempting to exit the school.

Theodore Landsmark 

On April 5, 1976, Theodore Landsmark, a black lawyer and executive director of the Boston Contractors' Association, was on his way to a meeting at City Hall when he was intercepted by a delegation of South Boston and Charlestown High students who were leaving the city council chamber after having aired their views on busing. As Landmark crossed through the plaza, he was accosted by the marchers, struck several times in the side and back, and belted by the staff of an American flag.

References 

Education in Boston